The Great Bed of Ware is an extremely large oak four poster bed, carved with marquetry, that was originally housed in the White Hart Inn in Ware, England.  Built by Hertfordshire carpenter Jonas Fosbrooke about 1590, the bed measures 3.38m long and 3.26m wide (ten by eleven feet) and can 'reputedly... accommodate at least four couples'. Many of those who have used the bed have carved their names into its posts.

Like many objects from that time, the bed is carved with patterns from European Renaissance art. Originally it would have been brightly painted, and traces of these colours can still be seen on the figures on the bed-head. The design of the marquetry panels is derived from the work of Dutch artist Hans Vredeman de Vries (1527–1604) and the panels were probably made by English craftsmen working in London in the late Elizabethan period. The bed-hangings are modern re-creations of fabrics of the period.

By the 19th century, the bed had been moved from the White Hart Inn to the Saracen's Head, another Ware inn. In 1870, William Henry Teale, the owner of the Rye House, acquired the bed and put it to use in a pleasure garden.  When interest in the garden waned in the 1920s, the bed was sold.  In 1931, it was acquired by the Victoria and Albert Museum in London, having previously turned down an opportunity to acquire the bed in 1865, describing it as a "coarse and mutilated relic in no wise appropriate as a new acquisition".

From April 2012, the bed was exhibited for a year in Ware Museum, on loan from the Victoria and Albert Museum.

References to the Great Bed in literature
The bed, which has been described as "one of the most famous pieces of furniture in history", has been referenced by writers since shortly after it was made:
William Shakespeare's Twelfth Night (circa 1601)
Ben Jonson's Epicoene, or the Silent Woman
George Gordon Byron's Don Juan
George Farquhar's The Recruiting Officer
Djuna Barnes's Nightwood
Loretta Chase's Last Night's Scandal (page 90)
Sarah MacLean's No Good Duke Goes Unpunished
Deanna Raybourn's "Silent on the Moor"
Charles Dickens' The Holly Tree
Wolfgang Hildesheimer's Tynset (1965, p. 188)
Casey McQuiston’s Red, White & Royal Blue

References

Bibliography

External links

Images of the Great Bed of Ware are available on the V&A website
 
The Great Bed in Ware
BBC Article about the Bed's move to Ware for a year

Beds
Collections of the Victoria and Albert Museum
English furniture
1590 in art
Ware, Hertfordshire
Individual pieces of furniture
Elizabethan era